Matileola is a genus of long-beaked fungus gnats in the family Lygistorrhinidae.

Species
M. similis Papp, 2005
M. thaii Papp, 2005
M. yangi Papp, 2002

References

Sciaroidea genera